Steven Anthimides (born January 17, 1977) is an American politician who served as a Republican in the Kansas House of Representatives from 2013 until his term expired in January of 2017. He replaced fellow Republican Phil Hermanson, who resigned his seat in October 2013 after several controversies, and was re-elected in 2014. In 2016, Anthimides was defeated for re-election by Democrat Steven Crum.

References

1977 births
Living people
Republican Party members of the Kansas House of Representatives
Politicians from Wichita, Kansas
21st-century American politicians